Bakhva Otarovich Tedeyev (born 18 September 1969, in Tskhinvali) is a retired Russian football player. He was the head coach of FC Alania Vladikavkaz in 2002, 2003 and 2005.

Honours
 Russian Premier League winner: 1995.
 Russian Premier League runner-up: 1992, 1996.
 Russian Premier League bronze: 1993, 1998.
 Top 33 players year-end list: 1992, 1993, 1995, 1996.

International career
Tedeyev made his debut for Russia on 13 February 1993 in a friendly against United States. He scored his first goal for Russia four days later in another friendly, against El Salvador.

References
  Profile

1969 births
Living people
Soviet footballers
Russian footballers
Russia international footballers
FC Dinamo Tbilisi players
FC Spartak Vladikavkaz players
FC Dynamo Moscow players
FC Lokomotiv Moscow players
Soviet First League players
Russian Premier League players
Ossetian people
Russian football managers
FC Spartak Vladikavkaz managers
Russian Premier League managers
People from Tskhinvali

Association football midfielders